Xavier Breton (born 25 November 1962 in Darney, Vosges) is a French politician of The Republicans (LR) who has been deputy for Ain's 1st constituency since 2007 and regional councillor of Auvergne-Rhône-Alpes since 2016.

In the Republicans’ 2016 presidential primaries, Breton endorsed François Fillon as the party’s candidate for the office of President of France. Ahead of the 2022 presidential elections, he publicly declared his support for Michel Barnier as the Republicans’ candidate. He was re-elected at the 2022 French legislative election.

References 

1962 births
Living people
People from Darney
Union for a Popular Movement politicians
The Republicans (France) politicians
Deputies for Ain (French Fifth Republic)
Deputies of the 13th National Assembly of the French Fifth Republic
Deputies of the 14th National Assembly of the French Fifth Republic
Deputies of the 15th National Assembly of the French Fifth Republic
Regional councillors of Auvergne-Rhône-Alpes
Deputies of the 16th National Assembly of the French Fifth Republic